Alexia Pamela Da Silva Lima (born 21 December 2000) is a Uruguayan footballer who plays as a defender for Peñarol and the Uruguay women's national team.

International career
Da Silva capped for Uruguay during the 2018 Copa América Femenina.

References 

2000 births
Living people
Women's association football defenders
Uruguayan women's footballers
Uruguay women's international footballers
Peñarol players